Andrew Law may refer to:
 Andrew Bonar Law (1858–1923), British prime minister, from 1922
 Andrew Law (financier) (born 1966), British hedge fund executive
 Andrew Law (composer) (1749–1821), American composer and preacher
 Andrew Law (artist) (1873–1967), Scottish artist
 Michael Andrew Law (born 1982), Hong Kong artist

See also
 Law (surname)
 Law (disambiguation)